Prodigals of Monte Carlo is a 1926 romance novel by the British writer E. Phillips Oppenheim. It marked a departure from the usual style for Oppenheim who was better known for his thriller, mystery and adventure novels.

Synopsis
After discovering from his doctor that he only has six months to live, Sir Hargrave Wendever decides to spend the time in Monte Carlo enjoying himself. As a gesture of he invites Betty Oliver and her impoverished artist fiancée to accompany him at his expense.

Film adaptation
It was adapted into the French silent film Monte Carlo directed by Louis Mercanton and starring Carlyle Blackwell and Betty Balfour.

References

Bibliography
 Braude, Mark. Making Monte Carlo: A History of Speculation and Spectacle. Simon and Schuster, 2017.
 Goble, Alan. The Complete Index to Literary Sources in Film. Walter de Gruyter, 1999.
 Reilly, John M. Twentieth Century Crime & Mystery Writers. Springer, 2015.

External links
 

1926 British novels
Novels by E. Phillips Oppenheim
British romance novels
Novels set in London
Novels set in Monaco
Hodder & Stoughton books
British novels adapted into films